The 2016 Korean FA Cup, known as 2016 KEB Hana Bank FA Cup, was the 21st edition of the Korean FA Cup. Suwon Samsung Bluewings won their fourth FA Cup title after defeating defending champions FC Seoul in the final, and qualified for the 2017 AFC Champions League.

Qualifying rounds

First round
The first round was held on 12 and 13 March 2016.

Second round
The second round was held on 26 March 2016.

Third round
The third round matches were played between 23 April and 3 May 2016.

Final rounds

Bracket

Round of 32
The round of 32 was held on 11 May 2016.

Round of 16
The round of 16 was held on 22 June 2016.

Quarter-finals
The quarter-finals were held on 13 July 2016.

Semi-finals
The semi-finals were held on 26 October 2016.

Final
The final was held on 27 November and 3 December 2016.

See also
2016 in South Korean football
2016 K League Classic
2016 K League Challenge
2016 Korea National League
2016 K3 League

References

External links
Official website
Regulations at KFA 

Korean FA Cup seasons
2016 in South Korean football